Daipotamon minos is a cavernicolous freshwater crab species found in a single limestone cave near La Tai village in Libo county, Guizhou province at an altitude of about 600 m above sea level, where it inhabits slowly flowing or stagnant parts of a subterranean river. It is the only species of the genus Daipotamon.

References 

Potamoidea
Cave crustaceans
Freshwater crustaceans of Asia
Arthropods of China
Endemic fauna of China
Crustaceans described in 1996